Hsinchu or Hsinchu City is  a city in northern Taiwan.

Hsin-Chu or Hsinchi may also refer to:

Places in Taiwan
 Hsinchu Air Base, an airbase in North District, Hsinchu City
 Hsinchu County, a county in north-western Taiwan
 Hsinchu Fish Harbor, a harbor inHsinchu City
 Hsinchu Hills,  an area of hills stretching across Hsinchu County
 Hsinchu HSR station, an elevated station of the Taiwan High Speed Rail in Zhubei, Hsinchu County
 Hsinchu Science Park, an industrial park that straddles Hsinchu City and Hsinchu County
 Hsinchu TRA station, a railway station in East District, Hsinchu City
 Hsinchu Zoo,  a zoo in East District, Hsinchu City

Other uses
 Hsinchu American School, a private international school that offers grades 1–12 in Hsinchu, Taiwan
 Hsinchu Campaign (11 June – 2 August 1895), a military campaign during the Japanese invasion of Taiwan (1895)
 Hsinchu International School, a private international school that offers K–12 education in Hsinchu, Taiwan